Abramovka is a rural locality (a village) in Kolchugino, Kolchuginsky District, Vladimir Oblast, Russia. The population was 16 as of 2010.

Geography 
Abramovka is located on the Peksha River, 5 km north of Kolchugino (the district's administrative centre) by road. Otyayevka is the nearest rural locality.

References 

Rural localities in Kolchuginsky District